The  is a two-lane national expressway spur route in Aomori, Aomori Prefecture, Japan. It is owned and operated by East Nippon Expressway Company and is signed E4A as a direct extension and spur route of the Tōhoku Expressway.

Route description

The expressway is officially referred to as the Tōhoku Jūkan Expressway Hachinohe Route.

The expressway serves as an extension to the Tōhoku Expressway (which terminates at Aomori Interchange) and runs through southern areas of the city of Aomori. From Aomori Interchange, it runs east, crossing under the tracks of the Tōhoku Shinkansen. Soon after the expressway meets the Aomori Belt Highway, a bypass of National Route 7, which serves for several kilometers from here as a frontage road to the expressway. Eventually, the two roads have are linked by the Aomori-chūō Interchange where tolls are collected for the entire expressway, including any tolls accrued from traveling from the Tōhoku Expressway. The expressway continues east and splits from National Route 7 before it comes to its end at Aomori-higashi Interchange near the western terminus of the Michinoku Toll Road.

The speed limit is 70 km/h for the entire route.

History
Construction on Aomori Expressway began in 1999 and it was opened to traffic on 28 September 2003. The completion of the expressway reduced travel times from the Tōhoku Expressway to Central Aomori by 11 minutes and reduced congestion along the Aomori West Bypass.

Future
Though the Aomori Expressway terminates at Aomori-higashi Interchange, it is planned to eventually connect with the northern terminus of the Hachinohe Expressway in the town of Oirase via a series of toll roads.

Junction list
The entire expressway is in Aomori Prefecture. The expressway is a direct extension of the Tōhoku Expressway.

|colspan="8" style="text-align: center;"|Through to 

|colspan="8" style="text-align: center;"|Through to

See also

References

External links

 East Nippon Expressway Company

Expressways in Japan
Roads in Aomori Prefecture
Tōhoku Expressway
2003 establishments in Japan